Francesco Gasparini (19 March 1661 – 22 March 1727) was an Italian Baroque composer and teacher whose works were performed throughout Italy, and also on occasion in Germany and England.

Biography

Born in Camaiore, near Lucca, he studied in Rome with Corelli and Pasquini. His first important opera, Roderico (1694), was produced there. In 1702 he went to Venice and became one of the leading composers in the city. In 1720 he returned to Rome for his last important work, Tigrane (1724). He wrote the first opera using the story of Hamlet (Ambleto, 1705) though this was not based on Shakespeare's play.

Gasparini was also a teacher, the instructor of Marcello, Quantz and Domenico Scarlatti. He was musical director of the Ospedale della Pietà, where he employed Antonio Vivaldi as a violin master. He wrote a treatise on the harpsichord (1708). At one time, Metastasio was betrothed to his daughter. He died in Rome in 1727.

Works

Operas

See List of operas by Francesco Gasparini.

Other
 Missa canonica for four voices and basso continuo (Venice, 1705)

Reception

Gasparini's works were performed throughout Italy, and also on occasion in Germany and England.

Missa canonica

Gasparini's Missa Canonica was known to Johann Sebastian Bach, who, in 1740, copied it out and—after adding parts for strings, oboes, cornett, trombone, and organ—performed its Kyrie and Gloria in both the St. Thomas Church, Leipzig and St. Nicholas Church, Leipzig.

Recordings
Dori & Daliso – Mirena & Floro, Auser Musici, Carlo Ipata, director, Symphonia SY 03207 (2004)
Cantate da Camera a voce e basso continuo – Susanna Rigacci soprano; Gabriele Micheli harpsichord. Tactus TC 660701 (2004)
 Il Bajazet – Auser Musici; Carlo Ipata, director; Giuseppina Bridelli, soprano; Ewa Gubańska, mezzo-soprano; Benedetta Mazzucato, contralto; Giorgia Cincirpi, mezzo-soprano; Antonio Giovanni, countertenor; Filippo Mineccia, countertenor; Raffaele Pè, countertenor; Leonardo De Lisi, tenor. Glossa GCD923504 (2015)
  Arie Sacre -Eleonora Alberici, soprano; Mario Genesi, harsichord (2007), includes motect "Panis Angelicus" by F. Gasparini

References

Kennedy, Michael (2006), The Oxford Dictionary of Music, 
Warrack, John and West, Ewan (1992), The Oxford Dictionary of Opera,

External links

1661 births
1727 deaths
18th-century Italian male musicians
18th-century Italian composers
Italian Baroque
Italian Baroque composers
Italian male classical composers
Italian music theorists
Musicians from the Province of Lucca
Pupils of Bernardo Pasquini